The Roanoke Downtown Historic District is a national historic district located in the Downtown Roanoke area of Roanoke, Virginia. It encompasses 122 contributing buildings. It includes a variety of commercial, institutional, social, and governmental buildings and structures from the late 19th century to the mid-20th century.  Notable buildings include the Roanoke City Public Library, the YMCA Central Branch Building, First Christian Church (1925), the Central Church of the Brethren (1924), Tomnes Cawley Funeral Home (1928), Thomas B. Mason Building (1961), Peerless Candy Co. (c. 1916), City Hall / Municipal Building (1915), Roanoke Times Building (1892), Anchor Building / Shenandoah Building (1910), Greene Memorial Methodist Church (1890), and United States Post Office and Courthouse (1930).  Located in the district are the separately listed Patrick Henry Hotel, the Boxley Building, the Campbell Avenue Complex Historic District, Colonial National Bank, and First National Bank.

It was listed on the National Register of Historic Places in 2002.

References

External links 
Roanoke City Public Library, 706 South Jefferson Street, Roanoke, Roanoke City, VA: 1 photo and 1 photo caption page at Historic American Buildings Survey
Roanoke Municipal Building & Annex, 216 Campbell Avenue Southwest & 215 Church Avenue Southwest, Roanoke, Roanoke City, VA: 8 photos, 10 data pages, and 1 photo caption page at Historic American Buildings Survey

Historic American Buildings Survey in Virginia
Historic districts on the National Register of Historic Places in Virginia
National Register of Historic Places in Roanoke, Virginia
Buildings and structures in Roanoke, Virginia
Beaux-Arts architecture in Virginia
Neoclassical architecture in Virginia